William Adams may refer to:

Military
William Adams (naval officer, died 1748), British naval officer
William Adams (naval officer, born 1716) (1716–1763), British naval officer
William Adams (pilot) (1564–1620), English sailor and samurai in Japan
William E. Adams (1939–1971), US Army officer and Medal of Honor recipient
William Wirt Adams (1819–1888), Confederate States of America army general

Musicians
Billy Adams, banjo player, a former member of Dexys Midnight Runners
will.i.am (William James Adams, Jr., born 1975), musician, producer; member of The Black Eyed Peas
Willy Northpole (William Adams, born 1980), rapper signed to Ludacris' DTP Records
Billy Adams (rockabilly musician) (1940–2019), American rockabilly musician

Politicians
Acton Adams (William Acton Blakeway Adams, 1843–1924), New Zealand politician
Billy Adams (politician) (William Herbert Adams, 1861–1954), Governor of Colorado
William Adams (British Columbia politician) (1851–1936), rancher and politician in British Columbia, Canada
William Adams (1752–1811), MP for Totnes
William Adams (New Zealand politician) (1811–1884), New Zealand politician
William E. Adams (New York politician) (1922–1983), New York politician
William G. Adams (1923–2005), Canadian politician
William Henry Adams (1809–1865), British Conservative MP for Boston and Chief Justice of Hong Kong
William Taylor Adams (1822–1897), author & politician
William Thomas Adams (1884–1949), British Member of Parliament for Hammersmith South, 1945–1949
Willie Adams (politician) (born 1934), Canadian politician
William Weston Adams (1786–1831), American politician, planter and medical doctor
William H. Adams (Virginia politician) (1872–1958), American politician in the Virginia House of Delegates
William Y. Adams (1927–2019), archaeologist

Science, technology and philosophy
William Adams (locomotive engineer) (1823–1904), British locomotive engineer
William Adams (Master of Pembroke) (1706/7–1789), English scholar
William Adams (oculist) (1783–1827), English ophthalmic surgeon
William Bridges Adams (1797–1872), British inventor, author & locomotive engineer
William Grylls Adams (1836–1915), professor of natural philosophy

Sportspeople
Bill Adams (offensive lineman) (born 1950), former Buffalo Bills offensive guard
Bill Adams (American football coach), American college football coach
Bill Adams (Australian footballer) (1900–1973), VFL player and coach
Bill Adams (footballer, born 1902) (1902–1963), Southampton FC right half back
Bill Adams (footballer, born 1921) (1921–1997), English footballer
Bill Adams (ice hockey) (1897–1978), Canadian ice hockey player
Billy Adams (footballer, born 1897) (1897–1945), footballer for Barrow and West Bromwich Albion
Billy Adams (footballer, born 1919) (1919–1989), English footballer
William Adams (cricketer, born 1885) (1885–1957), English cricketer
William Adams (cricketer, born 1905) (1905–1971), English cricketer
William Adams (footballer), footballer who played for Walsall and West Bromwich Albion
Willie Adams (1910s pitcher) (1890–1937), American baseball player
Willie Adams (1990s pitcher) (born 1972), American baseball player (Oakland Athletics)
Willie Adams (American football) (born 1941), American football player
Willie Adams (basketball) (1911–1992), American basketball player
Smiley Adams (William Ernest Adams), racehorse trainer

Writers
William Adams (author) (1814–1848), English religious writer
William Davenport Adams (1851–1904), English writer and journalist, son of W. H. D. Adams
William Henry Davenport Adams (1828–1891), English writer and journalist
William Y. Adams (1927–2019), American author of Nubia: Corridor to Africa
W. E. Adams (1832–1906), English radical and journalist

Clergy
William Adams (Dedham) (1650–1685), minister of the First Church and Parish in Dedham
William Adams (educator) (1813–1897), co-founder of Nashotah House 
William Adams (minister) (1807–1880), American religious leader and college president
William Forbes Adams (1833–1920), bishop of the Episcopal Diocese of Easton

Other uses
William Adams (haberdasher) (1585–1661), London haberdasher and founder of Adams' Grammar School
William Adams (lawyer) (1772–1851), English lawyer, helped negotiate settlements with the US c.1814/1815
William Adams (potter) (c. 1746–1805), North Staffordshire potter, founded the Greengates Pottery
William Bridges-Adams (1889–1965), British stage director
William Drea Adams, president of Bucknell University, 1995–2000; president of Colby College, 2000–2014
William Adams (mining engineer) (1813–1876)
William L. Adams (pioneer) (1821–1906), American writer, newspaper editor and doctor from Oregon
William L. Adams (businessman) (1914–2011), Baltimore businessman and venture capitalist 
William S. Adams (1892–1930), American cinematographer
William Adams (lifesaver) (1864–1913), English lifesaver from Gorleston
William George Stewart Adams (1874–1966), British political scientist and public servant
William M. Adams (b. 1955), British geographer

See also
Adams (surname)
Bill Adam (born 1946), Scottish racing driver
William Adam (disambiguation)